The Charles Schuchert Award  is presented by the Paleontological Society to a person under 40 whose work reflects excellence and promise in the science of paleontology. The award was made in honor of Charles Schuchert (1858 – 1942), an American invertebrate paleontologist.

Awardees 
Source: Paleontological Society
2021: Melanie Hopkins
2020: Lee Hsiang Liow
2019: Jingmai O'Connor
2018: Seth Finnegan
2017: Caroline Strömberg
2016: Alycia Stigall
2015: Jonathan Payne
2014: Shanan Peters
2013: Bridget Wade
2012: Gene Hunt
2011: C. Kevin Boyce
2010: Philip Donoghue
2009: Tom Olszewski
2008: Michael Engel
2007: John Alroy
2006: Shuhai Xiao
2005: Michal Kowalewski 
2004: Peter J. Wagner
2003: Steven M. Holland
2002: Bruce S. Lieberman
2001: Loren E. Babcock
2000: Michael J. Foote
1999: Charles R. Marshall
1998: Paul L. Koch
1997: Mary L. Droser
1996: Douglas H. Erwin
1995: Susan M. Kidwell
1994: Christopher G. Maples
1993: Peter R. Crane
1992: Stephen J. Culver
1991: Donald R. Prothero
1990: William I. Ausich & Carlton E. Brett 
1989: Simon Conway Morris
1988: David Jablonski
1987: Andrew H. Knoll
1986: John A. Barron
1985: Jennifer A. Kitchell
1984: Daniel C. Fisher
1983: J. John Sepkoski, Jr.
1982: James Sprinkle
1981: Philip D. Gingerich 
1980: James Doyle
1979: R. Niles Eldredge
1978: Robert L. Carroll
1977: Steven M. Stanley
1976: Thomas J. M. Schopf
1975: Stephen Jay Gould
1974: James W. Schopf
1973: David M. Raup

See also

 List of paleontology awards

References 

Paleontology awards
Awards established in 1973
Paleontological Society